Haymarket Ice Rink was a former ice skating and curling venue in Edinburgh, Scotland, which opened in 1912 and closed in 1978.

It was constructed following the availability of land resulting from the relocation of James Swan's cattle market to Chesser, and was sited near to Haymarket railway station. The venue was home to the Bellshill Curling Club, and when it closed, the club relocated to the new curling rink at Murrayfield Ice Rink.

References

External links
Images at Royal Commission on the Ancient and Historical Monuments of Scotland

Sports venues in Edinburgh
Defunct sports venues in Scotland
1978 disestablishments in Scotland
Demolished buildings and structures in Scotland
Curling in Scotland
Sports venues completed in 1912
1912 establishments in Scotland
Curling venues in Scotland